NMJ or nmj may refer to:

 Neuromuscular junction, a chemical synapse between a motor neuron and a muscle fiber
 NMJ, the station code for Nidamangalam Junction railway station, Tamil Nadu, India
 nmj, the ISO 639-3 code for Nombe language, Cameroon